Panaad may refer to:

Panaad sa Negros Festival, a festival held in Bacolod City, Philippines
Panaad Park and Sports Complex, a recreational park and sports complex in Bacolod City, Philippines
Panaad Stadium, a stadium within the Panaad Park and Sports Complex